Greg Burke may refer to:

 Greg Burke (athletic director), director of athletics for Northwestern State University
 Greg Burke (baseball) (born 1982), Major League Baseball relief pitcher who played for San Diego and the New York Mets
 Greg Burke (journalist) (born 1959), American former TV news correspondent and adviser to Pope Francis
 Greg Burke (rugby league) (born 1993), rugby league player

See also 

 Gregory Burke (born 1968), Scottish playwright
 Gregory Burke (curator), Canadian museum director, writer and curator